The New South Wales Legislative Assembly is the lower of the two houses of the Parliament of New South Wales, an Australian state. The upper house is the New South Wales Legislative Council. Both the Assembly and Council sit at Parliament House in the state capital, Sydney. The Assembly is presided over by the Speaker of the Legislative Assembly.

The Assembly has 93 members, elected by single-member constituency, which are commonly known as seats. Voting is by the optional preferential system.

Members of the Legislative Assembly have the post-nominals MP after their names.
From the creation of the assembly up to about 1990, the post-nominals "MLA" (Member of the Legislative Assembly) were used.

The Assembly is often called the bearpit on the basis of the house's reputation for confrontational style during heated moments and the "savage political theatre and the bloodlust of its professional players" attributed in part to executive dominance.

History

The Legislative Assembly was created in 1856 with the introduction of a bicameral parliament for the Crown Colony of New South Wales. In the beginning, only men were eligible to be members of the Assembly, and only around one half of men were able to pass the property or income qualifications required to vote. Two years later, the Electoral Reform Act, which was passed despite the opposition of the Legislative Council, saw the introduction of a far more democratic system, allowing any man who had been resident in the colony for six months the right to vote, and removing property requirements to stand as a candidate. Following Australia's federation in 1901, the New South Wales parliament became a State legislature. Women were granted the right to vote in 1902, and gained the right to be members of the Assembly in 1918, with the first successful candidate being elected in 1925.

Chamber
The Legislative Assembly sits in the oldest legislative chamber in Australia. Originally built for the Legislative Council in 1843, it has been in continuous use since 1856. The colour of the Legislative Assembly chamber is green, which follows the British tradition for lower houses.

Function
Most legislation is initiated in the Legislative Assembly. The party or coalition with a majority of seats in the lower house is invited by the Governor to form government. The leader of that party subsequently becomes Premier of New South Wales, and their senior colleagues become ministers responsible for various portfolios. As Australian political parties traditionally vote along party lines, most legislation introduced by the governing party will pass through the Legislative Assembly.

As with the federal parliament and other Australian states and territories, voting in the Assembly is compulsory for all those over the age of 18. Elections are held every four years on the fourth Saturday in March, as the result of a 1995 referendum to amend the New South Wales Constitution. An early election can only be held if the government fails a vote of no confidence and no alternative government can command a vote of confidence.

Current distribution of seats

 47 votes as a majority are required to pass legislation.

Administrative officers

Clerk
The clerk of the house of the NSW Legislative Assembly is the senior administrative officer. The clerk advises the speaker of the Assembly and members of parliament on matters of parliamentary procedure and management. The office is modelled on the clerk of the House of Commons of the United Kingdom. The following have served as clerks:
Richard O’Connor 
Charles Thompson 
Oliver Kelly 
Stephen Jones 
Frederick Webb CMG 
Richard Arnold 
William Mowle 
Sydney Boydell 
William Rupert McCourt CMG 
Frederick Langley 
Harry Robbins MC 
Allan Pickering CBE 
Ivor Vidler CBE 
Ronald Ward 
Douglas Wheeler 
Grahame Cooksley 
Russell Grove PSM 
Ronda Miller 
Helen Minnican

Serjeant-at-arms
The ceremonial duties of the serjeant-at-arms are as the custodian of the mace, the symbol of the authority of the House and the speaker, and as the messenger for formal messages from the Legislative Assembly to the Legislative Council. The serjeant has the authority to remove disorderly people, by force if necessary, from the Assembly or the public or press galleries on the instructions of the speaker. The administrative duties of the serjeant include allocation of office accommodation, furniture and fittings for members' offices, co-ordination of car transport for members, mail and courier services for the House, security for the House and arrangements for school visits. Once a meeting has started in an Assembly, the serjeant will usually stand at the door to keep authority and make sure no one else comes in or out. The following have served as serjeant-at-arms:
Laurence Joseph Harnett 
John Mackenzie Webb
Harry Robbins
Ivor Percy Kidd Vidler
Hubert Pierre Scarlett
Ronald Edward Ward
Frederick Augustine Mahony 
William  Geoffery Luton 
Peter John McHugh
William Christie
Leslie Gönye
Simon Johnston

See also 

 2019 New South Wales state election
 List of New South Wales state by-elections
 Parliaments of the Australian states and territories
 Members of the New South Wales Legislative Assembly
 New South Wales Legislative Assembly electoral districts
 Women in the New South Wales Legislative Assembly

Notes

References

External links
Official website

New South Wales Constitution Act (1902).
 NSW Legislative Assembly Practice, Procedure and Privilege

 
Parliament of New South Wales
New South Wales
1856 establishments in Australia